Duellen (The Duel) is a 1962 Danish drama film directed by Knud Leif Thomsen. It was entered into the 12th Berlin International Film Festival.

Cast
 Frits Helmuth - Mikael
 Malene Schwartz - Tina
 John Price - Claes
 Axel Strøbye - Basse
 Hans Kurt - 1. skuespiller
 Buster Larsen - 2. skuespiller
 Vera Gebuhr - Lene
 Albert Watson - Kampdommeren
 Ulla Darni - Refrænsangerinden Sussy
 Elith Pio - Tinas morfar
 Poul Müller - Professoren
 Karl Stegger - Opsynsmanden
 Aage Winther-Jørgensen - Bloddonor
 Minna Jørgensen - Sygeplejerske
 Paul Thomsen - Tjener
 Knud Rex - Konferencieren

Setting 
This film came about whilst in Denmark, there was an intense debate whether censorship should remain and meddle in, what (foreign) classic erotic literature could be translated and published together with similar upcoming domestic works, or which age group could be considered allowed to watch films of interest to youth.

Synopsis and critics reception 
The story is a classic triangle drama about Mikael, a medicine student, who the casual liberal man he thinks he is, works extra at a strip club, where he meets and falls in love with Tina. She dreams of a film career, and works extra as an assistant and mistress for an older cynical film director Claes. When Mikael finds out, confused and hurt, he rather surprisingly challenges Claes to a duel.

The film received positive reviews for being the first Danish film in a long time to believe in something and shed light on moral and social issues of the time.

References

External links

1962 films
1960s Danish-language films
1962 drama films
Danish black-and-white films
Films directed by Knud Leif Thomsen
Danish drama films